Guillaume de Chateauneuf (died c. 1258, in Acre) was the nineteenth Grand Master of the Knights Hospitaller, serving first from 1242–1244 as the successor to Pierre de Vieille-Brioude. He was captured during the Battle of La Forbie in 1244, held hostage in Egypt and ransomed through the Sixth Crusade. During his captivity, his position was filled on an interim basis by Jean de Ronay. De Ronay died in 1250, and de Chateauneuf was released shortly thereafter. He was succeeded by Hugues de Revel.

Biography 
Guillaume de Chateauneuf, a French knight, joined the Order on 3 October 1233 and became Marshal of the Order (Maréchal de l'Ordre) on 18 November 1241. He took over the leadership of the Order on 31 May 1242. He was taken prisoner and replaced in his duties as Grand Master by Jean de Ronay. However, the date of his death is not known; he was already replaced by his successor Hugues de Revel on 9 October 1258, but he was still in office on 20 February 1258 and most probably died in the summer of 1258.

Possession and loss of Jerusalem  
When de Chateauneuf took over as Grand Master, the Ayyubids were in full competition and had just left Jerusalem to the Christians. The Templars began fortifying the city in 1244 when the Khwarezmian invasion occurred. This Turkish tribe, which had invaded Mesopotamia, was called by the Sultan of Egypt: they seized Tiberias, Safed and Tripoli and began the Siege of Jerusalem on 15 July 1244, where the walls were very inadequate following the agreement between Frederick II and al-Kamil. The patriarch of Jerusalem, Robert of Nantes, and the Grand Masters of the Temple and the Hospitallers, having come to raise the courage of the inhabitants, repelled the attackers but the imperial lord and the great tutor of the Hospital lost their lives in the battle. In the confusion, the inhabitants left Jerusalem on July 15, but saw the banners of the Christians flying on the city walls; deceived, they turned back and were all massacred, while the city was sacked.

Battle of La Forbie
The forces allied to the Christians, associated with the Templars, the Hospitallers and Teutonic Knights, and the Muslims of Syria and Transjordan left Acre on 4 October 1244, marched on Jaffa and fell on the Khwarezmians and the Egyptian troops on 17 October. In the Battle of La Forbie, near Gaza, the Muslim allies dropped out at the first encounter and the Christians found themselves alone. The unequal fighting ended in disaster; 16,000 men lost their lives and 800 were taken prisoner, among them 325 knights and 200 turcoples of the Hospitallers, including de Chateauneuf, who was taken to Cairo; only 18 Templars and 16 Hospitallers were able to escape.

It was then that Jean de Ronay took over as interim Grand Master. He had been the Grand Tutor of the Hospital during the battle of La Forbie, and became lieutenant ad interim while waiting for the release of de Chateauneuf.

The liberation of de Chateauneuf 
The loss of Jerusalem and the defeat at La Forbie essentially eliminated Western military power in the Holy Land. Louis IX of France was compelled to respond, resulting in the Seventh Crusade. After its disastrous results (which included the death of Jean de Ronay), Louis IX returned to Acre on 13 May 1250. He was urged on all sides to return to France, but he did not want to leave the Holy Land until he had secured the release of the prisoners. To hasten their release, he twice delegated Jean de Valencienne, who thanks to these efforts obtained the release of a large number of prisoners, including Guillaume de Chateauneuf and twenty-five Hospitallers who arrived in Acre on 17 October 1250. In 1256, a ten-year truce was concluded between Aybak, effectively ruler of Egypt, an-Nasir Yusuf, sultan of Damascus, and the barons of the Holy Land, the Knights Templar and the Hospitallers, the king of France, represented by Geoffrey of Sergines, and the Count of Jaffa, John of Ibelin.

The war between Genoa and Venice 
The Genoese and the Venetians had shared possession of the church of Saint Sabas, and each wanted exclusive possession, leading to the War of Saint Sabas. The pope thought he had solved the problem by committing the abbot to sell the church to the Genoese, but then reversed his decision. Those who had sided with the rights of Hugh II of Lusignan rallied around the Venetians, including the Templars, and those who had sided with Conradin, including the Hospitallers, rallied around the Genoese. The Hospitallers waited for the success of the Genoese fleet around Acre with the contingent gathered by Philippe de Montfort. But, on 24 June 1258, it was the failure of the Genoese fleet, the Venetians ruin their district in Acre by sharing it and the prisoners are led to Tyre. This marked the end of hostilities.

Guillaume de Chateauneuf died shortly thereafter and was succeeded by Hugues de Revel.

See also

 Cartulaire général de l'Ordre des Hospitaliers
 List of Knights Hospitaller sites
 Langue (Knights Hospitaller)
 Flags of the Knights Hospitaller

References

Bibliography

External links
Guillaume de Chateauneuf. French Wikipedia.
Liste des grands maîtres de l'ordre de Saint-Jean de Jérusalem. French Wikipedia.
Eugène Harot, Essai d’armorial des Grands-Maîtres de l’Ordre de Saint Jean de Jérusalem.
Seals of the Grand Masters. Museum of the Order of St John.
Charles Moeller, Hospitallers of St. John of Jerusalem. Catholic Encyclopedia (1910). 7. New York: Robert Appleton Company.
Knights of the Order of the Hospital of St John of Jerusalem, Encyclopædia Britannica. 24. (11th ed.). Cambridge University Press. pp. 12–19.

Grand Masters of the Knights Hospitaller
Knights Hospitaller
1258 deaths
Year of birth unknown